Annie Alizé, née Pellicia, (born 14 June 1955 at Mananjary in Madagascar) is a former  French sprinter.

Biography  
During the French Athletics Championships in 1977, she won both the 100 metres and  200 metres races. She also won two national titles indoors: 50 metres in 1978 and 60 metres in 1979.

In 1979, she won the silver medal in the 200m at the 1979 Mediterranean Games in Split. She ran for the Club C.A.M.N Villeurbanne.

Prize list  
 France Championships in Athletics:  
 winner of 100m in 1977.   
 winner of 200m in 1977.   
 Athletics Indoor Championships France:  
 winner of 50m in 1978.   
 winner of 60m in 1979.

Records

Notes and references  

  Docathlé2003, French Athletics Federation, 2003, p. 387

External links  
 All Athletics Profile

Mediterranean Games gold medalists for France
Mediterranean Games silver medalists for France
Athletes (track and field) at the 1975 Mediterranean Games
Athletes (track and field) at the 1979 Mediterranean Games
Mediterranean Games medalists in athletics
French female sprinters
People from Vatovavy-Fitovinany
1955 births
Living people